Stanley Eveling, or Harry Stanley Eveling (4 August 1925 in Newcastle upon Tyne – 24 December 2008 in Edinburgh) was an English playwright and academic, based in Scotland.

Life 
Eveling was educated at Rutherford College and Samuel King's School. After serving as an officer with the Durham Light Infantry in the Far East at the end of the Second World War, he attended King's College, Durham University, where he was editor of King's Courier, the student newspaper. He then completed a postgraduate degree in philosophy at Oxford University. Eveling taught at the University of Aberdeen and the University College of Wales, Aberystwyth, before becoming a senior lecturer and a teaching fellow in philosophy at the University of Edinburgh, and later professor of moral philosophy. He was also the television critic for The Scotsman.

His plays include Come and Be Killed, Buglar Boy and other works. Eveling's plays have been performed worldwide and in Edinburgh at the Traverse Theatre since the 1960s.

He died of cancer on 24 December 2008.

References

External links

1925 births
2008 deaths
Academics of Aberystwyth University
Academics of the University of Aberdeen
Academics of the University of Edinburgh
Alumni of the University of Oxford
British Army personnel of World War II
Deaths from cancer in Scotland
Durham Light Infantry officers
English male journalists
People from Newcastle upon Tyne
Scottish dramatists and playwrights
Theatre in Scotland
English male dramatists and playwrights
20th-century English dramatists and playwrights
20th-century English male writers
Alumni of King's College, Newcastle
20th-century English philosophers